Paul Viola is a computer vision researcher, and Distinguished Engineer at Microsoft. He is a former MIT professor, and a former vice president of science for Amazon Air. He is best 
known for his seminal work in facial recognition and machine learning.   He is 
the co-inventor of the Viola–Jones object detection framework along with Michael Jones. He won the Marr Prize in 2003 and the Helmholtz Prize from the International Conference on Computer Vision in 2013.
He
is the holder of at least 57 patents in the areas of advanced machine learning, web search,
data mining, and image processing.
He is the author of more than 50 academic
research papers with over 56,000 citations.

References

External links
 Detecting Faces (Viola Jones Algorithm) - Computerphile

Living people
Computer vision researchers
Massachusetts Institute of Technology faculty
Machine learning researchers
1966 births